Paulette Bourgeois,  (born July 20, 1951) is a Canadian writer best known for creating Franklin the Turtle, the character who appears in picture books illustrated by Toronto native Brenda Clark. The books have sold more than 60 million copies worldwide and have been translated into 38 languages.  An animated television series, merchandise, DVDs and full-length films are based on the character.

Education and early career
Born in Winnipeg, Manitoba, Bourgeois graduated with a Bachelor of Science degree in Occupational therapy from the University of Western Ontario in 1974. She was a psychiatric occupational therapist for three years before deciding to focus on her writing. She studied journalism at Carleton University then worked as a reporter for the Ottawa Citizen and CBC Television. She became a freelance journalist in Washington, D.C. contributing pieces to Chatelaine, Canadian Living, Reader's Digest and Maclean's. She returned to Toronto in 1983. Bourgeois graduated with an MFA in creative writing from the University of British Columbia in 2009.

Franklin
After the birth of her first child, Natalie, she decided to write a children's book inspired by the Season 7 episode of M*A*S*H entitled C*A*V*E, where Hawkeye Pierce admits that he is claustrophobic and refuses to go into a cave, "If I were a turtle I would be afraid of my own shell", he explained. After Franklin in the Dark was illustrated by Brenda Clark and published in 1986.

She is also the author of Changes in You and Me, books about adolescence, the Oma's Quilt was developed as a short film by the National Film Board of Canada, Big Sarah's Little Boots and more. Paulette has also written dozens of non-fiction books for children including the Amazing series, the In My Neighbourhood series, The Sun, and The Moon. She has been a columnist for Homemaker's Magazine, written for Canadian Living, Chatelaine and Today's Parent and she provided the concept and initial research for "The Bee Talker" which aired on CBC TV's The Nature of Things. She has written three episodes of the TV documentary series, Creepy Canada, and has just finished the script for a full-length feature film, Loving Mrs. Twiggy.   

The Canadian Association of Occupational Therapists asked Bourgeois to write a picture book explaining the work of occupational therapists. You, Me and My OT was published in 2009.  It tells the story of Emma, a feisty young girl with cerebral palsy who participates in everyday classroom occupations. 

She has two grown-up children, Natalie and Gordon and lives in Toronto, Ontario.

Honours
In 2003, she became a Member of the Order of Canada and in 2007, she received an Honorary Doctor of Laws from her alma mater, the University of Western Ontario, and an Award of Merit from the Canadian Association of Occupational Therapists.

Selected works
 On Your Mark, Get Set ...: All About the Olympics Then and Now (1987)
 The Amazing Apple Book (1987)
 The Amazing Paper Books (1989)
 Starting with Space: The Sun (1995)
 Starting with Space: The Moon (1995)
 Oma's Quilt (2001)

References

External links
 Maclean's Magazine - Million Dollar Turtle (Wayback Machine)
 

1951 births
Living people
20th-century Canadian writers
21st-century Canadian writers
20th-century Canadian women writers
21st-century Canadian women writers
Canadian Broadcasting Corporation people
Canadian children's writers
Canadian television reporters and correspondents
Carleton University alumni
Franco-Manitoban people
Members of the Order of Canada
University of British Columbia alumni
University of Western Ontario alumni
Occupational therapists
Writers from Winnipeg
Franklin the Turtle (books)